Botanical gardens in Sri Lanka have collections consisting entirely of Sri Lanka native and endemic species; most have a collection that includes plants from around the world. There are botanical gardens and arboreta in all states and territories of Sri Lanka, most are administered by local governments, and some are privately owned.
 Hakgala Botanical Garden
 Henarathgoda Botanical Garden, 
 Mirijjawila Botanical Garden
 Royal Botanical Gardens, Peradeniya, Kandy
 Seethawaka Wet Zone Botanic Gardens

References 

Sri Lanka
Botanical gardens